Allah Jilai Bai (1 February 1902 – 3 November 1992) was a folk singer from Rajasthan, India.

Born in Bikaner to a family of singers, by the age of 10 she was singing in the Durbar of Maharaja Ganga Singh. She took singing lessons from Ustad Hussain Baksh Khan and later on from Achhan Maharaj. At one time she sung in the court of Ganga Singh, the Maharajah of Bikaner.

She was well versed in Maand, Thumri, Khayal and Dadra. Perhaps her best-known piece is Kesaria Balam. In 1982, the Indian Government awarded her the Padma Shri in Arts field, one of the highest civilian awards. She was also given the Sangeet Natak Akademi Award in 1988 for Folk Music, and was posthumously awarded the Rajasthan Ratna in 2012.

References

External links
 Allah Jilai Bai on realbikaner.com
 Padamshri Allah Jillai Bai
 Listen Allah Jillai Bai's Folk Songs on FolkRajasthan.com

1902 births
1992 deaths
Place of death missing
People from Bikaner
Recipients of the Padma Shri in arts
Indian women folk singers
Indian folk singers
20th-century Indian women singers
20th-century Indian singers
Women musicians from Rajasthan
Singers from Rajasthan